HM Prison Parc is a Category B men's private prison and Young Offenders Institution in Bridgend, Mid Glamorgan, Wales. Parc Prison is operated by G4S, and is the only privately operated prison in Wales.

History
The site was previously occupied by Parc Hospital, a psychiatric hospital. Parc Prison was procured a Private Finance Initiative contract in January 1996. The new prison, which was built by Costain Group at a cost of £82 million, opened in November 1997.

However, from its opening, Parc Prison was beset with problems. Failures in the prison security technology, anti-English racism from Welsh inmates, and a high number of suicides were all highlighted as concerns by Her Majesty's Chief Inspector of Prisons in a 1999 report. However, in March 2001, a new report from the Chief Inspector noted a major improvement in standards.

In August 2004, the Independent Monitoring Board issued a report stating that Parc Prison had been rated as the worst-performing privately run prison in Wales and England (of the then ten in existence). The report criticised the lack of separate healthcare facilities for juveniles at the prison, the inadequate level of dental provision for all prisoners, and issues of staff morale.

In January 2013, the Ministry of Justice announced that an additional houseblock would be constructed at Parc Prison, increasing the overall capacity of the facility.

Current state
Parc Prison holds Remand and Sentenced Category B Adult males, juveniles and young offenders. All cells in the prison are equipped with in-cell sanitation, natural and forced ventilation, and in-cell electrics. The prison states that all wings are equipped with hot-water boilers, PIN telephones, pool and table tennis tables, showers, laundry facilities, and association areas.

Education at Parc Prison is provided by an in-house education department. A range of subjects are offered including English, maths, information technology, art, music, hospitality and languages, plus a range of vocational qualifications.  Qualifications up to and including Open University courses are available. The prison's industries complex comprises nine workshops including carpentry, metalwork, graphic design and print, and industrial cleaning. All other workshops are dedicated to manufacturing contracts with local companies.

Other facilities at the prison include a library, gym, fitness room, and a multi-faith chaplaincy. The prison's visits hall has a canteen and crèche.

Parc has ten different wings consisting of eight main wings and two YPU wings. Prisoner accommodation is made up of a mix of single cells and double cells.

Notable inmates
Mark Aizlewood

Ian Watkins https://en.m.wikipedia.org/wiki/Ian_Watkins_(Lostprophets_singer)

References

External links
 Ministry of Justice pages on Parc
 G4S Parc homepage

G4S
Prisons in Bridgend County Borough
1997 establishments in Wales
Young Offender Institutions in Wales
Private prisons in the United Kingdom
Men's prisons